Gribanovsky (masculine), Gribanovskaya (feminine), or Gribanovskoye (neuter) may refer to:
Gribanovsky District, a district of Voronezh Oblast, Russia
Gribanovsky (inhabited locality) (Gribanovskaya, Gribanovskoye), several inhabited localities in Russia